Pristaulacus stigmaticus is a species of wasp in the family Aulacidae. It is known only from Singapore.

References

Parasitic wasps
Articles created by Qbugbot
Insects described in 1868
Evanioidea